Behind the Blackest Tears is the second studio album by Kingdom of Sorrow, a group featuring Jamey Jasta of Hatebreed and Kirk Windstein of Crowbar and Down. The album was released by Relapse Records.

Track listing

Special edition bonus tracks 
 "Soldiers of Hell" – 3:29 (Running Wild cover)
 "No Class" – 2:39 (Motörhead cover)

Personnel 
 Jamey Jasta - lead vocals
 Kirk Windstein - guitars, backing vocals
 Charlie Bellmore - guitars, bass
 Nick Bellmore - drums

References 

2010 albums
Kingdom of Sorrow albums
Relapse Records albums